Mazubon may refer to:
 Mazubon, Gilan
 Mazubon-e Olya, Mazandaran Province
 Mazubon-e Sofla, Mazandaran Province